Cardrona can refer to:

Cardrona, New Zealand - a locality between Wanaka and Queenstown
Cardrona Alpine Resort - a ski field close to Cardrona
Cardrona, Scottish Borders - a village in the Scottish Borders